Cobbinshaw Reservoir is a reservoir in West Lothian, Scotland. It is situated near the Pentland Hills, 5 km south of West Calder. The  site is a Site of Special Scientific Interest (SSSI) and is popular with wildfowl.

History
Cobbinshaw Reservoir was built by James Jardine to feed the Union Canal via the Bog Burn, Murieston Water, and through Mid Calder to the Almondell Aqueduct and Lin's Mill Canal Feeder which feeds into the canal just east of the Almond Aqueduct.

External links
Geograph Image 38901 Cobbinshaw Reservoir
Geograph Image 618321 Cobbinshaw, Jetty
Canmore

See also
Eliburn Reservoir
Harperrig Reservoir
List of reservoirs and dams in the United Kingdom
List of places in South Lanarkshire

Reservoirs in West Lothian